Raging derived from rage may refer to:

Raging River, a modest tributary to the much larger Snoqualmie River in western Washington State in the United States
"Raging" (song), Kygo song featuring Kodaline

See also
Rage (disambiguation)
Griefer